The abbreviation PECL can refer to:

 PHP Extension Community Library, a repository of extensions for the PHP programming language
 Positive emitter-coupled logic, a family of digital integrated circuits
 Principles of European Contract Law, a scholarly restatement of the contract law of European legal systems